Joe Hutshing is an American film editor who grew up in San Diego, California and is best known for working multiple times with film director, Oliver Stone and well as with film director Cameron Crowe (who is also from San Diego, California). Hutshing graduated from the University of Oregon in 1980.

Hutshing has received Academy Awards for the films Born on the Fourth of July (1989) and JFK (1991); both were directed by Oliver Stone. His greatest commercial successes have been The Tourist, which grossed 278 million dollars, and Jerry Maguire, which grossed 274 million dollars worldwide.

Hutshing has been elected to membership in the American Cinema Editors.

Selected filmography

As film editor 
The release date and director of each film are indicated in parentheses.

 Talk Radio (1988 - Stone)
 Born on the Fourth of July with David Brenner (1989 - Stone)
 The Doors with David Brenner (1991 - Stone)
 JFK with Pietro Scalia (1991 - Stone)
 Indecent Proposal (1993 - Lyne)
 French Kiss (1995 - Kasdan)
 Broken Arrow (1996 - Woo)
 Jerry Maguire (1996 - Crowe)

 Almost Famous with Saar Klein (2000 - Crowe)
 Vanilla Sky with Mark Livolsi (2001 - Crowe)
 Live from Baghdad (2002 - Jackson) (TV)
 Something's Gotta Give (2003 - Meyers)
 The Skeleton Key (2005 - Softley)
 The Holiday (2006 - Meyers)
 Lions for Lambs (2007 - Redford)
 W. (2008 - Stone)
 It's Complicated (2009 - Meyers)
 The Tourist (2010 - Donnersmarck)
 Savages (2012 - Stone)
 Aloha (2015 - Crowe)
 The Greatest Showman (2017 - Gracey)
 Robin Hood with Chris Barwell (2018 - Bathurst)

Other 
 Valley Girl (1983) (Assistant Editor)
 The Princess Bride (1987) (Sound Assistant)
 Being John Malkovich (1999) (Additional Editor)
 We Bought a Zoo (2011) (Additional Editor)
 Independence Day: Resurgence (2016) (Additional Editor)

Academy Award nominations and wins 
 1990 – Born on the Fourth of July (won) Best Film Editing w/ co-editor David Brenner
 1992 – JFK (won) Best Film Editing w/ co-editor, Pietro Scalia
 1997 – Jerry Maguire (nominated) Best Film Editing
 2001 – Almost Famous (nominated) Best Editing w/ co-editor, Saar Klein

Other award nominations and wins 
 1990 – Born on the Fourth of July (nominated) American Cinema Editors ACE Eddie - Best Edited Feature Film w/ co-editor David Brenner
 1992 – JFK (won) American Cinema Editors ACE Eddie - Best Edited Feature Film w/ co-editor, Pietro Scalia
 1993 – JFK (won) BAFTA Film Award - Best Editing w/ co-editor, Pietro Scalia
 2001 – Almost Famous (won) American Cinema Editors ACE Eddie - Best Edited Feature Film - Comedy or Musical w/ co-editor, Saar Klein
 2001 – Almost Famous (nominated) Las Vegas Film Critics Society Awards - Sierra Award - Best Editing w/ co-editor, Saar Klein
 2003 – Live from Baghdad (2002) (TV) (won) Emmy Award - Outstanding Single Camera Picture Editing for a Miniseries, Movie or a Special
 2003 – Live from Baghdad (2002) (TV) (nominated) American Cinema Editors ACE Eddie - Best Edited Motion Picture for Non-Commercial Television

References 

 Rowe, Robin (2007). "The Hutshing Hustle: Self-Taught Editor for Hire", Editors Guild Magazine Volume 28, Number 6, November–December. Online version retrieved 2008-06-23.

External links 
 

American film editors
Best Editing BAFTA Award winners
Best Film Editing Academy Award winners
American Cinema Editors
Place of birth missing (living people)
Year of birth missing (living people)
Living people
Point Loma High School alumni
University of Oregon alumni